The 1995 NCAA Division I Outdoor Track and Field Championships were contested May 31 – June 3 at Tom Black Track at LaPorte Stadium at the University of Tennessee in Knoxville, Tennessee in order to determine the individual and team national champions of men's and women's collegiate Division I outdoor track and field events in the United States. 

These were the 73rd annual men's championships and the 14th annual women's championships. This was the Volunteers' second time hosting the event (although the first time hosting women's events) and first since 1969.

In a repeat of the previous three years' results, Arkansas and LSU topped the men's and women's team standings, respectively; it was the Razorbacks' fifth men's team title and the ninth for the Lady Tigers. This was the fourth of eight consecutive titles for Arkansas. The Lady Tigers, meanwhile, captured their ninth consecutive title and, ultimately, the ninth of eleven straight titles they won between 1987 and 1997.

Team results 
 Note: Top 10 only
 (H) = Hosts
Full results

Men's standings

Women's standings

References

NCAA Men's Outdoor Track and Field Championship
NCAA Division I Outdoor Track and Field Championships
NCAA
NCAA Division I Outdoor Track and Field Championships
NCAA Division I Outdoor Track and Field Championships
Sports competitions in Tennessee
NCAA Women's Outdoor Track and Field Championship